Regina Catholic Education Center is a PK–12 private, Roman Catholic co-educational school in Iowa City, Iowa, United States. It is located in the Roman Catholic Diocese of Davenport.

Athletics 
Regina's sports teams are known as the Regals, with a school mascot named "Crownie," an anthropomorphic blue and gold crown.

The Regals won a state football championship in 2005, and more recently have won a state record six titles in a row from 2010 to 2015, a string that included a record 56 game winning streak from 2010 to 2013.  Since 2007, the team has been coached by former NFL tight end Marv Cook, who attended high school at Regina's conference rival West Branch High School.

The Regals have won eight state titles in boys' cross-country since 1993.  The girls' softball team took the state title in 2011.

State Championships 
 Boys' Cross Country - 8-time State Champions (1993, 1997, 1998, 2003, 2004, 2006, 2007, 2010, 2022)
 Boys' Soccer - 8-time Class 1A State Champions (2009, 2010, 2011, 2013, 2014, 2017, 2018, 2019)* Football - 7-time State Champions (2005, 2010, 2011, 2012, 2013, 2014, 2015, 2019)
 Boys' Basketball - 3-time Class 1A State Champions (1976, 1978, 1979)
 Softball - 3-time Class 2A State Champions (2011, 2015, 2017)
 Girls' Golf - 2009 Class 2A State Champions
 Girls' Track and Field - 1995 Class 1A State Champions

Notable alumni 
Jim Miller, offensive guard for the Atlanta Falcons

See also
List of high schools in Iowa

References 

Catholic secondary schools in Iowa
Private high schools in Iowa
Schools in Johnson County, Iowa
Buildings and structures in Iowa City, Iowa
Roman Catholic Diocese of Davenport